Robert Hirsch (26 July 1925 – 16 November 2017) was a French actor. He was a sociétaire of the Comédie-Française since 1952. In 1990, he won César Award for Best Actor in a Supporting Role for his role in Hiver 54, l'abbé Pierre.

His other film appearances included The Hunchback of Notre Dame, and in 2006/07 he appeared in Le gardien (a French adaptation of Harold Pinter's The Caretaker) at Théâtre de l'Oeuvre then Théâtre de Paris.

In April 2011, he asked Florian Zeller to write a part specially for him. The result was Le Père which had its first performance in Le Théâtre Hébertot, Paris, in September 2012. Hirsch played the central character, André, at the age of 87.

Partial filmography 

 The Turkey (1951) - Rédillon
 Royal Affairs in Versailles (1954) - Le duc de Charmeroy (uncredited)
 Les Intrigantes (1954) - Pakévitch
 Yours Truly, Blake (1954) - Saganoff
 Plucking the Daisy (1956) - Roger Vital
 The Hunchback of Notre Dame (1956) - Pierre Gringoire
 The Amorous Corporal (1958) - Boisrose
 Mimi Pinson (1958) - Jean-Lou
 Maigret et l'affaire Saint-Fiacre (1959) - Lucien Sabatier
 125 rue Montmartre (1959) - Didier Barrachet
 Adieu Philippine (1962) - Juan Salcedo dans l'émission de télévision 'Montserrat' (uncredited)
 Impossible on Saturday (1965) - Carlo, plus 11 other roles
 Monnaie de singe (1966) - Fulbert Taupin
 Kiss Me General (1966) - Martin
 All Mad About Him (1967) - Mathieu Gossin
 Les cracks (1968) - Me Mulot
 Appelez-moi Mathilde (1969) - Hubert de Pifre, l'officier
 Shock Treatment (1973) - Gérôme Savignat
 Chobizenesse (1975) - Jean-Sébastien Bloch
 La crime (1983) - Avram Kazavian
 Hiver 54, l'abbé Pierre (1989) - Raoul
 My Man (1996) - M. Hervé
 Mortel Transfert (2001) - Armand Zlibovic
 A Private Affair (2002) - Vieil homme
 The Art Dealer (2015) - Claude Weinstein (final film role)

Awards and nominations

Molière Awards

César Awards

References

Sources

 L'Avant-scene theatre No. 1331 Octobre 2012

External links

Robert Hirsch(Aveleyman)

1925 births
2017 deaths
People from L'Isle-Adam, Val-d'Oise
French male stage actors
French male film actors
French male television actors
20th-century French male actors
21st-century French male actors
French National Academy of Dramatic Arts alumni
Sociétaires of the Comédie-Française
Best Supporting Actor César Award winners